The Samsung G810 is a Symbian OS smartphone developed and released by Samsung Telecommunications. It was announced at Mobile World Congress on 11 February 2008.

The handset succeeds the previous G-model, the G800, incorporating the same 5-megapixel camera with Xenon flash, 3x Optical Zoom, and 3.5G capability, whilst adding Wi-Fi and GPS capabilities and running on the S60 (3rd Edition) Symbian platform. With these features in a slider-package, the G810 was aimed at rivaling Nokia's N95. It has an all-metal casing.

The G810 comes with QuickOffice pre-installed which ables to edit and create Microsoft Office 2003 file formats and read PDF files. Its web browser is WebKit based and is able to use WAP 2.0/xHTML, HTML, RSS feeds and video streaming.

It was succeeded by the Samsung i8510 Innov8.

See also
Nokia N95
Nokia N82
Sony Ericsson C905
Sony Ericsson C902
Sony Ericsson K850
Samsung F480 Tocco
Samsung U900 Soul

References

External links
 Samsung G810 review

Samsung smartphones
Symbian devices
G810
Mobile phones introduced in 2008
Slider phones